Hell Is for Heroes is a 1962 American war film directed by Don Siegel and starring Steve McQueen. It tells the story of a squad of U.S. soldiers from the 95th Infantry Division who, in the fall of 1944, must hold off an entire German company for approximately 48 hours along the Siegfried Line until reinforcements reach them.

Plot
Montigny, Meurthe-et-Moselle, 1944: Squad leader Sergeant Larkin (Harry Guardino) and his men are taking a well-deserved rest behind the lines after conducting front-line combat operations for several weeks.  Rumor has it the unit will be rotated state-side and the men are almost giddy in anticipation. During an interlude at a church and later at a tavern, the senior non-commissioned officer, Platoon Sergeant Pike (Fess Parker), happens upon acquaintance Private John Reese (Steve McQueen) who has been assigned to his platoon.  Reese was a former master sergeant, demoted to private after a court martial, who walks about armed with a distinctive M3 submachine gun. Reese is the quintessential troubled loner, managing to alienate almost everyone in the squad right from the beginning. Unlike his jubilant comrades, the prospect of a long break from combat, perhaps the end of the war itself, renders Reese morose.  The company commander, Captain Loomis (Joseph Hoover), is worried because Reese, although already having won a Distinguished Service Cross, acts irresponsibly when there is no fighting, but Pike comments that he is a good soldier in combat.

Pike informs the men that they will shortly be going back into the line rather than home. After much bitter complaining, the men get ready to move out. The remaining members of 2nd Squad include con-man/scavenger Corby (Bobby Darin); Corporal Henshaw (James Coburn), a mechanic who can fix anything; the easy-going, somewhat-naive kid, Cumberly (Bill Mullikin); and family man Kolinsky (Mike Kellin). The squad has their own mascot, a young Polish displaced person Homer Janeczek (Nick Adams), who is not a soldier, but stays with the squad in hopes of accompanying the men upon their return to the United States. The morning after they arrive at their appointed post and dig in, the men realize that an unannounced overnight withdrawal of the main American force has left them spread dangerously thin.  Finally, Pike arrives to explain the situation, which only heightens everyone's awareness that any reconnaissance by the Germans across the valley will quickly reveal how weak the American defenses are there.

One stroke of good luck is the sudden and mistaken arrival of an Army company clerk, Private First Class James Driscoll (Bob Newhart in his first film role).  Larkin quickly puts Driscoll’s jeep to use by having Henshaw drive it back and forth behind their lines, after rigging it to backfire and sound like a tank, in an attempt to fool the Germans.  Driscoll himself is put to use improvising misleading radio messages for a hidden microphone, discovered by Corby, left by the Germans in an abandoned pillbox (Newhart was noted for his telephone conversation skits in his stand-up comedy routines). Additionally, Larkin has his men run wire to three empty ammo cans, partially filled with rocks and hung from trees, distributed along gaps in their front lines, which they can pull to create noise to make the Germans believe that a much larger American force is conducting their standard patrol routine.

A German raid results in Cumberly's death, but Reese manages to eliminate three Germans in close combat. Worried that the German survivors will report on the under-strength American lines, Reese recommends attacking a large, opposing German pillbox, flanked by a minefield and barbed wire, to make the enemy pause and convince them the Americans are at normal strength.  Larkin, fearing an overwhelming enemy assault on their positions, decides to go find Pike and obtain his permission for the pillbox attack. Unable to locate Pike because he has gone to the rear, Larkin returns and berates Reese when he finds out Henshaw, whom Larkin had put in charge in his absence, had been convinced by Reese to go to a supply dump to obtain satchel charges. After a heated argument with Reese, Larkin is killed in an artillery barrage. Reese decides to proceed without orders and two others, Henshaw and Kolinsky, go along. Shortly after they set out, Sgt. Pike and the rest of the company begin to return to the line.

The squad's attack fails when Henshaw accidentally sets off an undetected S-mine, fatally burning with the exploding flamethrower tanks he carries, as well as illuminating the battlefield. Reese and Kolinsky retreat, covered by smoke from the company mortar squad. As they run back to their lines, Kolinsky is struck by shrapnel through the back and abdomen, and finally dies, screaming about his guts, as a medic and others attend to his wounds.

A furious Captain Loomis berates Reese and promises him a court-martial for defying orders to hold the line, but only after the American assault at dawn. The dominant German pillbox fires on the advancing Americans, who press on despite heavy casualties. Determined to eliminate the pillbox, Reese gets within striking range, aided by Corby, manning a flamethrower. Reese throws a satchel charge into the pillbox, but, in the process, is wounded in the back and stomach. When the unexploded satchel charge is tossed out by the alert defenders, the wounded Reese retrieves it and carries it back through the pillbox opening, blowing up the fortification's occupants and himself. Corby, at Pike's command, directs his flamethrower at the blown-out pillbox window, until it is engulfed with fire, as the Americans continue to advance, and fall, to other unseen German weapons.

Cast
 Steve McQueen as Private John Reese
 Bobby Darin as Private Dave Corby
 Fess Parker as Technical Sergeant Bill Pike
 Harry Guardino as Sergeant Jim Larkin
 Bob Newhart as Private First Class James E. Driscoll
 James Coburn as Corporal Frank Henshaw
 Nick Adams as Homer Janeczek
 Mike Kellin as Private Stan Kolinsky
 Bill Mullikin as Private Joe Cumberly
 Joseph Hoover as Captain Roger Loomis
 L.Q. Jones as Supply Sergeant Frazer
 Michele Montau as Monique Ouidel
 Don Haggerty as Captain Mace

Production
Writer Robert Pirosh was a former master sergeant with the 35th Infantry Division in World War II. He gained a reputation after writing the script for the 1949 film Battleground, about the American 101st Airborne Division paratroopers’ defense of Bastogne, then writing and directing Go for Broke!, a 1951 war film about the famed 442nd Regimental Combat Team.  Soon after Hell Is for Heroes, he created the World War II TV series Combat!. Pirosh based some of the events in his film on his unit being withdrawn from the Vosges area to move towards the Battle of the Bulge, with their former positions in the line held by a small force in a then-classified deception operation. Pirosh based Nick Adams' Polish character on an actual displaced person who followed his unit around.

Originally, Pirosh was also to have directed and produced the film, but he walked away from the project after trouble with McQueen. Pirosh's screenplay was originally entitled Separation Hill, but the title was changed by Paramount's publicity office as being too close to the 1959 Korean War film Pork Chop Hill (which Harry Guardino had been in) .

Many of the cast were angry over the studio's budget restrictions, which resulted in phony looking props, malfunctioning firearms and the same German having to be killed three or four times. In the last battle scene, McQueen can be seen experiencing multiple failures firing the M3 Grease Gun. These malfunctions were due to problems with the blanks used.

McQueen was reportedly furious with his agent for having induced him to sign onto the film and not securing the fee that he had been promised up front and for passing on another movie that he wanted.  Thus, his angry, detached "loner" look may not have been entirely due to his method acting. Columnist James Bacon visited the set and said that "Steve McQueen is his own worst enemy".  Bobby Darin overheard the remark and replied, "Not while I'm still alive." Bob Newhart said that he had been offered the film a year previous and found that the script had changed when Steve McQueen came on board; Newhart believed the original script had been set to feature Darin as the main star of the film.

McQueen and Siegel were continuously at odds during the production, with the two nearly coming to blows several times. In one scene, when McQueen was unable to cry while on camera, Siegel resorted to slapping him hard and blowing onion juice into his face, before administering eye drops that ran down the actor's face.

Parker, Coburn and others in the cast were working on other projects during the making of the film and would repeatedly show up in the nick of time and do their lines without makeup and little or no rehearsal. (Coburn also appeared with McQueen in The Magnificent Seven and another World War II film, The Great Escape as well as appearing in a couple of episodes of McQueen's 1950s western television series Wanted: Dead or Alive.)

Due to the intense heat of the 1961 summer in Cottonwood and Redding, California, many of the scenes were shot at night for the comfort of the actors.

During the production, Newhart's comedy albums were selling unexpectedly well, resulting in higher fee offers for stand-up comedy nightclub appearances.  As a result, he sought ways to have his character killed off so that he could leave the production.  The director consistently told him that he would be in the film until the end.

Both Newhart and Parker recalled that the film ended abruptly due to Paramount shortening the production of the film for financial reasons.

A novelisation of the screenplay was written by Curt Anders.

Star Trek: Deep Space Nine
Several of the guest characters in the Star Trek: Deep Space Nine episode "The Siege of AR-558" are named after characters and actors from this film. These include Patrick Kilpatrick's character Reese, Annette Helde's character Larkin and Bill Mumy's character Kellin (named after the actor Mike Kellin). Unseen characters named after characters from the film include Captain Loomis and Commander Parker. The episode has a similar plot, where Starfleet troops have been holding off repeated attacks from enemy forces for five months.

See also
 List of American films of 1962

References

External links 
 
 
 

1962 films
1962 war films
American war films
American black-and-white films
Films scored by Leonard Rosenman
Films directed by Don Siegel
Paramount Pictures films
Films set in 1944
Films set in France
Films shot in California
Western Front of World War II films
American World War II films
World War II films based on actual events
Siege films
1960s English-language films
1960s American films